Bánov is a municipality and village in the Nové Zámky District in the Nitra Region of south-west Slovakia.

History
In historical records the village was first mentioned in 1113.

Geography
The village lies at an elevation of 125 metres (410 ft) and covers an area of 19.763 km² (7.631 mi²). It has a population of about 3780 people.

Ethnicity
The population is about 98% Slovak.

Facilities
The village has a public library, a DVD rental store and a cinema. It also has a gym and football pitch.

Genealogical resources

The records for genealogical research are available at the state archive "Statny Archiv in Nitra, Slovakia"

 Roman Catholic church records (births/marriages/deaths): 1787-1895 (parish B)

See also
 List of municipalities and towns in Slovakia

External links
 Village website (in Slovak)
 Organisation in Bánov
Surnames of living people in Banov
Bánov – Nové Zámky okolie

Villages and municipalities in Nové Zámky District